The Marshallese ambassador in Washington, D. C. is the official representative of the Government in Majuro to the Government of the United States.

List of representatives

References 

 
United States
Marshall Islands